The Australia national cricket team toured South Africa from October 1949 to March 1950 and played a five-match Test series against the South African team. Australia won the Test series 4-0. Australia were captained by Lindsay Hassett; South Africa by Dudley Nourse.

Australian team
 AL Hassett (Victoria) (captain)
 KA Archer (Queensland)
 RN Harvey (Victoria)
 IW Johnson (Victoria)
 WA Johnston (Victoria)
 GR Langley (South Australia)
 RR Lindwall (New South Wales)
 SJE Loxton (Victoria)
 CL McCool (Queensland)
 JR Moroney (New South Wales)
 AR Morris (New South Wales)
 G Noblet (South Australia)
 RA Saggers (New South Wales)
 AK Walker (New South Wales)

Don Tallon withdrew from the tour party before departure and was replaced by Saggers. Keith Miller was called into the tour party midway through the tour when Johnston was injured in a car crash.

Test series summary

First Test

Second Test

Third Test

The Australian first innings had an unusual scoreboard - five batsmen scored two runs each, and another batsman was two not out.

Fourth Test

Fifth Test

References

External links
 Australia in South Africa 1949-50 at CricketArchive
 Test Cricket Tours - Australia to South Africa 1949-50 at Test Cricket Tours

1949 in South African cricket
1950 in Australian cricket
1950 in South African cricket
International cricket competitions from 1945–46 to 1960
1949
South African cricket seasons from 1945–46 to 1969–70